Austin FC is an American soccer club that plays in Austin, Texas as part of Major League Soccer, the top tier of the American Soccer Pyramid. Austin FC was found in 2018 and played their first season in the league in season. Home games are played at Q2 Stadium, competing in the Western Conference of the MLS. Austin FC is the first top-tier professional sports team in the city of Austin.

Players

Outfield Players
Current players on the Austin roster are shown in bold.
.

Goalkeepers
.

By Nationality
.

References

Austin FC
Austin FC
 
Association football player non-biographical articles
Austin FC Players